Tyler Walker may refer to:

Tyler Walker (baseball) (born 1976), American baseball pitcher
Tyler Walker (footballer) (born 1996), English association footballer for Coventry City F.C.
Tyler Walker (racing driver) (born 1979), American racing-car driver
Tyler Walker (skier) (born 1986), American skier

See also
 Walker (surname)
 Walker (disambiguation)